Gustav Schlosser (born 18 August 1939) is a Swiss athlete. He competed in the men's long jump at the 1960 Summer Olympics.

References

1939 births
Living people
Athletes (track and field) at the 1960 Summer Olympics
Swiss male long jumpers
Olympic athletes of Switzerland
Place of birth missing (living people)